Obersimmental District was one of the 26 administrative districts in the Canton of Bern, Switzerland. Its capital was Blankenburg in the municipality of Zweisimmen. The district had an area of 334 km² and consisted of 4 municipalities:

External links
 Official website of Zweisimmen

References

Former districts of the canton of Bern